The China Masters was a non-ranking snooker tournament staged on three occasions in 1985, 1986 and 1996.

The inaugural 1985 edition, held in Guangzhou, was the first professional tournament to be played in China, and featured the two 1985 World Snooker Championship finalists Steve Davis and Dennis Taylor, with Davis winning the final 2–1. The following season Davis again won the competition, this time defeating Terry Griffiths 3–0 in the final. A third tournament was held in 1996 for lower-ranked players; Rod Lawler won this tournament defeating Shokat Ali 6–3 in the final.

Winners

References

China Masters (snooker)
Snooker non-ranking competitions
Recurring sporting events established in 1985
Recurring events disestablished in 1996
Defunct snooker competitions